Different Style! is the second album by the British Jamaican reggae band Musical Youth, released in 1983.

Background

The album was released one year after the massive success of "Pass the Dutchie" and the first album. As The Youth of Today, Different Style! contains ten reggae tracks, however, this time more R&B-influenced, to make it more accessible on the North American market. Unlike the debut release, which was written strictly by Freddie Waite and the band members themselves, Different Style! saw more different musicians contributing to lyrics and music, including major stars Stevie Wonder and Boy George. Tracks sequence varied depending on territory, as did the album cover.

Five singles have been released off the album. "Tell Me Why" appeared long before the album's release and met with modest success. Two following singles, "007" and "Sixteen", charted only in the United Kingdom and Ireland, making it to the top 30 and top 25. At the same time, North American market opted for "She's Trouble" (originally written for Michael Jackson for his monster-selling Thriller album. It was offered to Musical Youth by David "Hawk" Wolinski and later recorded by Michael Lovesmith) which became the second single, after "Pass the Dutchie", to enter charts in the USA and Canada. In the UK, the song was their lowest-charting single and it happened to be also the very last chart entry for Musical Youth. "Whatcha Talking 'Bout" flopped completely in the charts.

Different Style! turned out a commercial flop and was overshadowed by the success of the debut album. It failed to enter UK Albums Chart, and only charted in Canada and the United States, peaking at disappointing positions 90 and 144 respectively.

Track listing

Original release
Side A
"007" (Desmond Dacres) - 3:18
"Yard Stylee" (Musical Youth) - 3:39
"Air Taxi" (Musical Youth) - 3:51
"Sixteen" (Freddie Waite, Lamont Dozier) - 3:51
"Incommunicado" (Bruce Sudano, Carlotta McKee, Gordon Grote) - 3:23
Side B
"Tell Me Why" (John Holt) - 3:13
"She's Trouble" (Billy Livsey, Terry Britten, Sue Shifrin) - 3:09
"Mash It the Youth Man, Mash It" (Musical Youth) - 4:22
"Whatcha Talking 'Bout" (Stevie Wonder) - 5:06
"No Strings" (Boy, Phil Picket) - 3:00

Alternative track listing
Side A
"007" (Desmond Dacres) - 3:18
"She's Trouble" (Billy Livsey, Terry Britten, Sue Shifrin) - 3:09
"Whatcha Talking 'Bout" (Stevie Wonder) - 5:06
"Incommunicado" (Bruce Sudano, Carlotta McKee, Gordon Grote) - 3:23
"No Strings" (Boy, Phil Picket) - 3:00
Side B
"Tell Me Why" (John Holt) - 3:13
"Sixteen" (Freddie Waite, Lamont Dozier) - 3:51
"Yard Stylee" (Musical Youth) - 3:39
"Air Taxi" (Musical Youth) - 3:51
"Mash It the Youth Man, Mash It" (Musical Youth) - 4:22

Personnel
Musical Youth
Dennis Seaton - vocals, percussion
Freddie "Junior" Waite - drums, vocals
Kelvin Grant - guitars, vocals
Michael Grant - keyboards, vocals
Patrick Waite - bass
with:
Donna Summer - uncredited vocals on "Sixteen"
Jody Watley - uncredited vocals on "Incommunicado"
Technical
John "Aruba" Arrias - engineer
Pete Hammond - engineer on "Tell Me Why"
Julian Mendelsohn - remixing
Jerry Hey - horn arrangements
Richard Myhill - horn arrangement on "Tell Me Why"
Gavin Cochrane - photography
"Thanks to – Bruce Sudano, Donna Summer, Jackie Castellano, Jackie Mittoo, Jody Watley, Lamont Dozier, Melvin "Wah Wah" Watson, Stevie Wonder, The Jacksons"

Chart performance

References

External links
 Different Style! at Discogs
 Different Style! at Rate Your Music

1983 albums
Albums produced by Peter Collins (record producer)
MCA Records albums
Musical Youth albums